Bærum Sportsklubb is a Norwegian association football club founded on 26 March 1910. The men's team is currently playing in the Norwegian Second Division, after being relegated from the 1. divisjon in 2015.

The club comes from Sandvika, the administrative centre of the municipality Bærum. The club was formed as Grane FK, but quickly changed its name to Grane SK to include different sporting codes. The club changed its name to IL Mode in 1946 after a merger with workers' sports team Sandvika AIL. It took its current name in 1969.

Bærum have won Norwegian Championships in ice hockey, team handball and bandy, but now operates as a football-only club. The club's finest hour took place in 2004 when the team beat Vålerenga 3-2 in the third round of the Norwegian Cup.

The team plays in yellow shirts and black shorts. The away strip for 2010 is light blue shirts and white shorts. The club now plays at Sandvika stadion, the club's traditional home ground, after having played its home games at Nadderud stadion for more than 30 years. The pitch was resurfaced with artificial turf in 2003.

History
In 2002, Bærum was promoted to 1. divisjon after winning their 2. divisjon group. Their stay in the 1. divisjon only lasted for one season, as they were relegated back to the Second Division in 2003.

The 2005 season ended with the club landing a disappointing fourth spot in the 2. divisjon table behind Sparta Sarpsborg, SK Vard Haugesund and Notodden FK. In December 2005 coach Arild Stavrum left the club after only one season in charge to take over 2005 Cup winners Molde FK. Jarle Hellesnes was appointed new head coach after Stavrum's departure. In 2006 Bærum secured second place in the league, two points behind Notodden.

The 2007 season was a disappointing one for the club. After good results in pre-season warm-up games and several good signings, the club was rated among the favourites for promotion. However, the team almost collapsed when real points were at stake. The club finished in sixth place, 19 points behind promoted IL Hødd. The only highlight during 2007 came when the team outplayed and beat Ham-Kam 2-0 in the second round of the Norwegian Cup. Ham-Kam were top of the 1. divisjon and unbeaten away from home at the time the game took place. Coach Jarle Hellesnes resigned before the season was over, with the resignation taking effect after the last game of 2007. Tomi Markovski, a former youth player for the club, who had led Asker from the 3. divisjon to second place in the 2. divisjon is the club's new head coach. His first season in Bærum was not as good as expected. Bærum finished fifth in the end, after losing most of the games after the summer.

Recent history 
{|class="wikitable"
|-bgcolor="#efefef"
! Season
! 
! Pos.
! Pl.
! W
! D
! L
! GS
! GA
! P
!Cup
!Notes
|-
|2002
|2. divisjon
|align=right bgcolor=#DDFFDD| 1
|align=right|26||align=right|17||align=right|6||align=right|3
|align=right|78||align=right|37||align=right|57
||3rd round
|Promoted to the 1. divisjon
|-
|2003
|1. divisjon
|align=right bgcolor="#FFCCCC"| 13
|align=right|30||align=right|7||align=right|6||align=right|17
|align=right|34||align=right|58||align=right|27
||Second round
|Relegated to the 2. divisjon
|-
|2004
|2. divisjon
|align=right |2
|align=right|26||align=right|17||align=right|2||align=right|7
|align=right|75||align=right|31||align=right|53
||Fourth round
|
|-
|2005
|2. divisjon
|align=right |4
|align=right|26||align=right|14||align=right|6||align=right|6
|align=right|66||align=right|42||align=right|48
||Second round
|
|-
|2006
|2. divisjon
|align=right |2
|align=right|26||align=right|17||align=right|5||align=right|4
|align=right|60||align=right|28||align=right|56
||Second round
|
|-
|2007
|2. divisjon
|align=right |6
|align=right|26||align=right|11||align=right|5||align=right|10
|align=right|55||align=right|42||align=right|38
||Third round
|
|-
|2008
|2. divisjon
|align=right |5
|align=right|26||align=right|15||align=right|1||align=right|10
|align=right|62||align=right|39||align=right|46
||First round
|
|-
|2009
|2. divisjon
|align=right |7
|align=right|26||align=right|13||align=right|3||align=right|10
|align=right|61||align=right|46||align=right|42
||Third round
|
|-
|2010
|2. divisjon
|align=right |7
|align=right|26||align=right|10||align=right|5||align=right|11
|align=right|52||align=right|44||align=right|35
||Second round
|
|-
|2011
|2. divisjon
|align=right bgcolor=#DDFFDD| 1
|align=right|24||align=right|15||align=right|6||align=right|3
|align=right|75||align=right|30||align=right|51
||Second round
|Promoted to the 1. divisjon
|-
|2012 
|1. divisjon
|align=right bgcolor="#FFCCCC"| 14
|align=right|30||align=right|5||align=right|7||align=right|18
|align=right|49||align=right|73||align=right|22
||Second round
|Relegated to the 2. divisjon
|-
|2013
|2. divisjon
|align=right bgcolor=#DDFFDD| 1
|align=right|26||align=right|19||align=right|3||align=right|4
|align=right|84||align=right|38||align=right|60
||Second round
|Promoted to the 1. divisjon
|-
|2014
|1. divisjon
|align=right |5
|align=right|30||align=right|15||align=right|4||align=right|11
|align=right|51||align=right|52||align=right|49
||Second round
|
|-
|2015 
|1. divisjon
|align=right bgcolor="#FFCCCC"| 15
|align=right|30||align=right|8||align=right|7||align=right|15
|align=right|44||align=right|67||align=right|31
||Third Round
|Relegated to the 2. divisjon
|-
|2016
|2. divisjon
|align=right |2
|align=right|26||align=right|14||align=right|5||align=right|7
|align=right|55||align=right|42||align=right|47
||Third Round
|
|-
|2017
|2. divisjon
|align=right |9
|align=right|26||align=right|8||align=right|9||align=right|9
|align=right|46||align=right|44||align=right|33
||Second Round
|
|-
|2018
|2. divisjon
|align=right |8
|align=right|26||align=right|12||align=right|4||align=right|10
|align=right|44||align=right|33||align=right|40
||Third Round
|
|-
|2019
|2. divisjon
|align=right |10
|align=right|26||align=right|7||align=right|8||align=right|11
|align=right|39||align=right|55||align=right|29
||Fourth Round
|
|-
|2020
|2. divisjon
|align=right |11
|align=right|13||align=right|1||align=right|8||align=right|4
|align=right|13||align=right|18||align=right|11
||Cancelled
|
|-
|2021
|2. divisjon
|align=right |9
|align=right|26||align=right|9||align=right|3||align=right|14
|align=right|41||align=right|51||align=right|30
||First round
|
|-
|2022
|2. divisjon
|align=right |10
|align=right|26||align=right|9||align=right|4||align=right|13
|align=right|36||align=right|46||align=right|31
||First round
|
|}
Source:

Notable players
Bærum's most famous players youth team was the boys' 1994 team, which included Marius Lundemo, Simen Juklerød, Daniel Granli, Markus Fjørtoft, Chris Wingate and Borger Thomas (the latter born in 1995). Other famous players include Lars Bohinen, Vidar Davidsen, Christer Basma and Thomas Finstad, as well as German journeyman goalkeeper Lutz Pfannenstiel.

Current squad 
As of 6 May 2021.

For season transfers, see transfers winter 2020–21 and transfers summer 2021.

References

External links
Official site 

 
Association football clubs established in 1910
Bandy clubs established in 1910
Defunct athletics clubs in Norway
Defunct ice hockey teams in Norway
Defunct bandy clubs in Norway
Defunct speed skating clubs in Norway
1910 establishments in Norway